The Vanitha Film Awards are presented annually by Vanitha, an Indian magazine from the Malayala Manorama group in the south Indian state of Kerala. The awards ceremony has been instituted to honour both artistic and technical excellence in the Malayalam language film industry. Held and broadcast annually since 1998, the ceremony has gained in popularity over the years and is currently one of the most-watched award ceremonies in Kerala.

Award categories 

 Lifetime achievement (special award)
 Best Actor
 Best Actress
 Best Director
 Best Movie
 Popular Movie
 Popular Actor
 Popular Actress
 Special Performance (Male)
 Special Performance (Female)
 Best Supporting Actor (Male)
 Best Supporting Actor (Female)
 Best Comedian
 Best Villain
 Best Star Pair
 Best Newcomer Actor
 Best Newcomer Actress
 Best Lyricist
 Best Music Director
 Best Singer (Male)
 Best Singer (Female)
 Best Cinematographer
 Best Script Writer
 Best Debut Director
 Best Choreographer

Title sponsors

Channel partners

2020 
The following are the list of the winners of Vanitha Film Awards 2020:

2019 
The following are the list of the winners of Vanitha Film Awards 2019:

2018 
The following are the list of the winners of Vanitha Film Awards 2018:

2017 
The following are the list of the winners of Vanitha Film Awards 2017:

2016 
The following are the list of the winners of Vanitha Film Awards 2016:

2015 
The following are the list of the winners of Vanitha Film Awards 2015:

2014 
The following are the list of the winners of Vanitha Film Awards 2014:

2013 
The following are the list of the winners of Vanitha Film Awards 2013:

2012 
The following are the list of the winners of Vanitha Film Awards 2012:

2011 
The following are the list of the winners of Vanitha Film Awards 2011:

2010 
The following are the list of the winners of Vanitha Film Awards 2010:

Stats

References 

Indian film awards
Malayalam cinema
Kerala awards
Malayala Manorama group
1998 establishments in Kerala